Sex object may refer to:
 Sexual objectification
 An object of sexual attraction  
 Sex symbol, a famous person or fictional character widely regarded to possess excessive sexual attractiveness

Music and books
 "Sex Object", a song by Kraftwerk from Electric Café
 Sex Objects, a 2004 album by The Briefs
Sex Objects: Art and the Dialectics of Desire, contemporary art book by Jennifer Doyle 2006
Sex Object, a 2016 book by Jessica Valenti

See also
 Object sexuality, a form of sexuality focused on particular inanimate objects
 Sex symbol (disambiguation)